Bertrand Fabien Gille (born 24 March 1978 in Valence, Drôme) is a handball player from France. Very strong physically (1.87m, 98 kg), and was honored with the title of World Player of the Year in 2002.

His career as a handball player started very early: in 1984, he played for HBC Loriol and followed sport étude as a scholastic path. From 1996 to 2002, he played for Chambéry SH (under the guidance of Philippe Gardent, another famous French handball player) before joining the German club HSV Hamburg. He has been playing together with his brother, Guillaume Gille, since they were little. They have played together in HBC Loriol, Chambéry SH and now HSV Hamburg.

Member of the national team since 1997, "Gilou" was again pivot on the team which, among others, won the handball competition at the 2008 Beijing Olympics, where he was also named best pivot of the tournament. He decided to suspend his international career after a physical injury contracted during the Handball-Bundesliga of 2009. His successor on the team was Cédric Sorhaindo. Now, 2010, Bertrand Gille is back on the team. He was a part of the team, who won European Championships 2010.  He was also part of the French team that won the gold medal at the 2012 London Olympics.

Personal life
He has two brothers; Guillaume Gille, born in 1976 and Benjamin Gille, born in 1982. Bertrand Gille is married with three children. His nickname is "Bobo".

Honours
 French Handballchampions 2001
 World Player of the Year 2002
 Vicechampion in Germany 2004 und 2008
 Supercupwinner in Germany 2004, 2006 und 2009
 German Cupwinner 2006, 2010
 French Cupwinner 2002
 Winner of Cup Winners Cup 2007
 Bronzemedal from European Championships 2008
 Goldmedal from Summer Olympics 2008 and 2012
 European Champion 2010

Seasons for HSV Hamburg

References

nbcolympics.com
Portrait on the French handball federation site (in French)

External links 
 
 
 

1978 births
Living people
Sportspeople from Valence, Drôme
French male handball players
Handball players at the 2000 Summer Olympics
Handball players at the 2004 Summer Olympics
Handball players at the 2008 Summer Olympics
Handball players at the 2012 Summer Olympics
Olympic handball players of France
Olympic gold medalists for France
Olympic medalists in handball
Medalists at the 2012 Summer Olympics
Medalists at the 2008 Summer Olympics
Officers of the Ordre national du Mérite
European champions for France
French expatriate sportspeople in Germany